Lixouri is a town and a municipality in the island of Kefalonia, the largest of the Ionian Islands of western Greece. It is the main town on the peninsula of Paliki, and the second largest town in Kefalonia after Argostoli and before Sami. It is located south of Fiskardo and west of Argostoli. Since the 2019 local government reform it is one of the three municipalities on the island. It has one municipal unit: Paliki.

History

The town was founded when citizens of ancient town Pale/Pali found a new location for a town. The town was named after Paleas or Pileas, one of the four sons of the mythical king Kefalos (the island was named after king Kefalos). The old city was abandoned completely by the 16th century, but some ancient ruins can still be seen north of the town.  The oldest document which contains the name "Lixouri" was sent in 1534 by local authorities to the Senate of Venice. In the 19th century Lixouri was a popular tourist destination; Richard Strauss visited the town. Many houses were destroyed in the earthquakes on January 23, 1867 and in August 1953. In the early 1950s the Royal Family of Greece sent their children for summer holidays to Lixouri. In the 1990s Lixouri increased in popularity as a tourist destination and some larger hotels were built south of the town near the beaches.

Literature
Lixouri is the home town of the poet and satirical author Andreas Laskaratos, who wrote about life in his home town. The Kay Cicellis book "Death of a Town" (1954) begins in Lixouri and describes the time of the earthquake. In 1720 Petros Katsaitis, who lived in Lixouri, wrote his play "Iphigenia"; Spyros Evangelatos' edition of the play in 1995 retitled it "Iphigenia in Lixouri". Ilka Chase wrote about the town in "The Varied Airs of Spring" (1969) as did Georges Haldas in "A la recherche du rameau d'or" (1976).

Infrastructure

Lixouri has a few primary schools and few middle schools (gymnasia), and high schools (lyceums). The 1st Primary School of Lixouri is one of the few buildings in the town that still stands from before the 1953 earthquake. The Ionian university has a campus in Lixouri, where the department of Ethnomusicology.

The public library and a museum are located at the Iakovateios building, also preserved from before the earthquake. Since 2003 Lixouri also has a theatre.

Transportation
Lixouri has a small port with a ferry to Argostoli for vehicles under 5 tons, running every hour or half-hour in peak season. In the summer, there is a service to Patras and Killini on the mainland. The KTEL bus service has a station in Lixouri with routes to Patras and Athens, via the port of Sami. There is a twice-daily bus service to the villages of the Paliki peninsula. Some hotels provide offer bus services, including to the XI-Beach and Kounopetra.

Demographics

Subdivisions
The municipality of Lixouri contains one municipal unit: Paliki. This municipal unit consists of the following communities (that were independent municipalities and communities before the 1997 Kapodistrias reform). Constituent settlements are given in brackets.
Agia Thekli (Agia Thekli, Kalata)
Atheras
Chavdata
Chavriata (Agios Ioannis, Chavriata)
Damoulianata
Favatata
Kaminarata (Kaminarata, Moni Kipouraion)
Katogi (Mantzavinata, Vardianoi (island), Vouni)
Kontogenada
Kouvalata (Kouvalata, Livadi)
Lixouri (Agios Dimitrios, Agios Vasileios, Lepeda, Lixouri, Loukerata, Michalitsata)
Monopolata (Delaportata, Monopolata, Parisata)
Rifi
Skineas (Skineas, Vlychata)
Soullaroi

Notable people 
 Georgios Bonanos (1863–1940), sculptor
 Antiochos Evangelatos (1903–1981), composer and conductor
 Andreas Laskaratos (1811–1901), poet
 Spyridon Marinatos (1901–1974) archaeologist
 Dionysios Zakythinos (1905–1993), Byzantinist
 Giovanni Francesco Zulatti (1762–1805), physician and author

See also
 List of settlements in Cephalonia

References

External links

 Lixouri | Tourist Guide KefaloniaVisit.com
 GTP Travel Pages - Lixouri

Populated places in Cephalonia
Municipalities of the Ionian Islands (region)